Jensen Rampart is a set of steep rock cliffs that rise to  at the southwestern edge of the Worcester Range, in Antarctica. The feature was named after Kate Jensen, a National Oceanic and Atmospheric Administration field team leader at South Pole Station, who also worked for Antarctic Support Associates and for Raytheon at South Pole.

References

Cliffs of the Ross Dependency
Hillary Coast